Dover is the name of some places in the U.S. state of Wisconsin:
Dover, Price County, Wisconsin, an unincorporated community
Dover, Buffalo County, Wisconsin, a town
Dover, Racine County, Wisconsin, a town